Jane Franklin is an American historian and scholar with a particular focus on Cuba–United States relations. Her 1992 book The Cuban Revolution and the United States: A Chronological History is regarded as encyclopedic, systematic, and based on "extremely wide-ranging research". She is a proponent of solidarity between the two nations. In addition to Cuba, she has written about Vietnam, Nicaragua, El Salvador and Panama. Her book Vietnam and America: A Documented History, which she co-edited, was described by The New York Times as a "valuable anthology of crucial texts and records" which "tersely replays the bitter conflict." During the 1960s, she and her husband H. Bruce Franklin became radicalized because of the Vietnam War and were regarded as leaders in the anti-war movement.

Selected publications
 Cuban Foreign Relations, 1959-1982, by Jane Franklin, Introduction by William LeoGrande, Center for Cuban Studies, 1984.
 Cuba and the United States: A Chronological History, by Jane Franklin, Ocean Press, 1997,  
 Vietnam and America: A Documented History edited by Jane Franklin, Marvin Gettleman, Marilyn B. Young, and H. Bruce Franklin, 2nd Edition, Grove Press, 1995  
 Cuba and the U.S.Empire: A Chronological History, by Jane Franklin, Foreword by Noam Chomsky, Monthly Review Press, 2016,

References

External links
 Writings in Progreso Weekly magazine
 https://www.janefranklin.info/ Jane Franklin's homepage

American women historians
Living people
Year of birth missing (living people)
21st-century American women writers